Bejay Mulenga  (born Bejjy Mulenga; 6 July 1995) is a British entrepreneur, founder CEO, creative consultant and public speaker. At age 20, Mulenga became the youngest recipient of the Queen's Award for Enterprise Promotion. He is founder of the training, recruitment and development company Supa Network and co-founder of the wellbeing and online food delivery company, The Great Feast of London. Mulenga featured in GQ magazine's list of "Britain's 100 Most Connected Men" and spearheaded the non-profit A Plate For London.

Early life and education 
Born in East London of Congolese heritage, Mulenga attended St Michael's Catholic College studying Business. It was here Mulenga developed a business model for his brand of confectionary tuck shops called Supa Tuck. Mulenga sat A Levels at St Charles College, and later studied Business Management at the University of Westminster.

Career 
In 2009, Mulenga started his career as an enterprising business studies student at St Michael's Catholic College. Here, Mulenga opened and successfully ran a small tuck shop. Encouraged by his entrepreneurial success, Mulenga licensed his brand of tuck shop across several schools. In 2012, he registered his business Supa Tuck, an alternative enterprise programme teaching students how to run and operate their own tuck shops in schools.

In June 2014, Supa Tuck featured in former Secretary of State Lord Young's ‘Enterprise For All’ report which reviewed the relevance of enterprise in education. Next, Mulenga co-founded Supa Academy, a comprehensive business training programme for young people. In September of that same year, Mulenga, aged 19, delivered a speech at the Conservative Party Conference in Birmingham.

In 2015, with support from Lord Young, and brands such as Pepsi Max, Facebook, and Barclays Lifeskills, Supa Academy launched the Supa Market supermarket, a pop-up retail enterprise event. In 2016, Mulenga became the youngest recipient of The Queen's Award for Enterprise Promotion.

Over the next few years, Mulenga would oversee the Supa brand's growth, diversifying into training, B2B education, and consultation working with such brands as Sony Music, Uber, Coca-Cola, Barclays, MTV, Facebook, River Island, Nike and more.

Supa Network 
Supa Network brings all of Mulenga's business endeavours under one roof, fusing social enterprise with education, spanning event production, creative content, Gen-Z marketing, influencer marketing and recruitment for large companies.

Mulenga has spoken about his experiences founding and scaling Supa Network at the US Embassy, The Tory Conference, Global Entrepreneurship Week, TEDx Switzerland and on BBC Radio.

Mulenga was appointed Member of the Order of the British Empire (MBE) in the 2023 New Year Honours for services to entrepreneurship and tackling food poverty.

No More Tea (podcast) 
In 2017, Mulenga launched the No More Tea podcast on iTunes. Dedicated to creative entrepreneurship, No More Tea offers supportive career advice through conversational interviews, and is accessible across on-demand streaming platforms. Well known guests have included The Slumflower and Pip Jamieson.

The Great Feast of London and A Plate For London 
Mulenga along with Street Feast's Dominic Cools-Lartigue founded The Great Feast of London. Initially set to run in the summer of 2021 as a series of physical boutique food festivals throughout London's parks, the COVID-19 pandemic caused the duo to bring plans forward. In July 2020, The Great Feast of London launched as a digital food festival and food for delivery platform focused on providing an in-home dining experience featuring top chefs and interactive events with wellbeing coaches, speakers, musicians and performance artists. Described as a rival to the likes of Deliveroo, The Great Feast of London is closely tied to the founders’ non-profit, A Plate For London which tackles food poverty across the capital by providing meals to Londoners in need.

Board memberships 
Mulenga has previously served as a board member of Mybnk's Youth Advisory Board.

Recognition 
 2017: "7 of London's Most Inspiring Young People", The Evening Standard
 2016: Queen's Award for Enterprise Promotion
 2016: "Britain's 100 Most Connected Men", GQ

See also 
 Queen's Awards for Enterprise

References

External links 
 

1995 births
Living people
People from Whitechapel
English businesspeople
English chief executives
Alumni of the University of Westminster
English podcasters
Members of the Order of the British Empire
English people of Democratic Republic of the Congo descent